Endry José Saavedra Pinto (born 14 May 1991) is a Venezuelan boxer. He competed in the men's middleweight event at the 2016 Summer Olympics.

References

External links
 

1991 births
Living people
Venezuelan male boxers
Olympic boxers of Venezuela
Boxers at the 2016 Summer Olympics
Place of birth missing (living people)
Middleweight boxers
Pan American Games medalists in boxing
Pan American Games bronze medalists for Venezuela
Medalists at the 2015 Pan American Games
Boxers at the 2015 Pan American Games